The Big Jim pepper is a New Mexico chile pepper cultivar of the species Capsicum annuum with a Scoville rating of mild.  This cultivar is extensively grown in New Mexico where it was developed and is popular in New Mexican cuisine.  Big Jim peppers are both sweet and mild and are normally picked while still green.  The fruits are large and thick walled, often exceeding over a foot in length, and they are almost exclusively used to produce roasted green chile in New Mexican cuisine.

History
The Big Jim pepper cultivar was developed at New Mexico State University by Dr. Roy Nakayama, a son of Japanese immigrants and a man who had once been denied entry into NMSU because of his ethnicity. The Big Jim is a hybrid of New Mexican chilies and a Peruvian pepper that was developed at New Mexico State University by Dr. Nakayama in 1975 in cooperation with Jim Lytle, the person for whom this chile pepper is named.  The Big Jim chile holds the Guinness Book of World Records as the largest chile pepper in the world, with individual fruits routinely exceeding 14 inches in length.  The peppers are mild when still green, but become more spicy as they ripen to red.  They are rarely used as in their ripe form, and are almost exclusively used to produce green chile.  In common with most New Mexico chile cultivars, Big Jim chiles are somewhat variable in their fruiting, and produce individual peppers of varying heat, with most of the peppers being very mild (500 SHU), and an occasional medium pepper (3,000 SHU).

See also
 Chimayó pepper
 Fresno chile
 New Mexico No. 9
 Santa Fe Grande
 Sandia chile
 New Mexico chile
 List of Capsicum cultivars

References

Capsicum cultivars
Chili peppers
Crops originating from North America
Cuisine of the Southwestern United States
Fruit vegetables
Mexican cuisine
Chile
Spices